Battle of Sloviansk may refer to:

Siege of Sloviansk, a 2014 Ukrainian operation in the War in Donbas
Battle of Sloviansk (2022), a battle in the 2022 Russian invasion of Ukraine